Sharksploitation is an exploitation film subgenre. The genre surged to popularity with Jaws and its sequels, but fell in popularity soon after. The film Deep Blue Sea brought it back to public prominence. The Sharknado series soared mockbuster sharksploitation to new heights of (sometimes tongue in cheek) fame.

Notable sharksploitation films

Other sharksploitation films 
The films below are more shark films that do not yet have their own pages here, or their notability has been unclarified.

Other films/shorts worth mentioning

See also
 Exploitation film
 Great white shark

References

External links
 
 Sharksploitation exhibit -- Living Sharks Museum
 Film School Rejects - "Sharksploitation: Feel the Grove According to 'Jaws'
 Smithsonian Magazine - "How Realistic Is The Shark Science in 'The Shallows'?"
 ABC News - "Why Has 'Sharknado' Become Such a Culture Phenomenon?"

Films by type
Film genres
Exploitation films
 
Films about shark attacks